Too Stupid to Die is an American reality television stunt series similar to Jackass. It premiered on MTV on August 21, 2018, and concluded its run on December 7 of the same year.

Cast
Zach Holmes
Coty Saints
Meggan Wentz
Tommy Anderson
Chadwick Allendorf
Damon Reynolds
Khyler Vick
Chad Tepper

Episodes

See also
CKY
The Dudesons
Dirty Sanchez
Tokyo Shock Boys
Nitro Circus

References

External links
 Too Stupid to Die at MTV
 Too Stupid to Die at IMDb

2010s American reality television series
2018 American television series debuts
2018 American television series endings
Groups of entertainers
MTV original programming
Stunt television series